Sweet Springs Historic District is a national historic district located at Sweet Springs, Saline County, Missouri.  The district encompasses 18 contributing buildings in the central business district of Sweet Springs. It developed between about 1875 and 1947, and includes representative examples of Queen Anne and Classical Revival style architecture.  Notable buildings include the Sweet Springs Post Office (1912), McEntire & Son Jewelry/Post Office (c. 1885), Chemical Bank (c. 1905), and Barbee Lodge 217 AF&AM (c. 1880s, 1919).

It was listed on the National Register of Historic Places in 1997, with a boundary decrease in 2010.

References

Historic districts on the National Register of Historic Places in Missouri
Queen Anne architecture in Missouri
Neoclassical architecture in Missouri
Buildings and structures in Saline County, Missouri
National Register of Historic Places in Saline County, Missouri